Acer poliophyllum is an Asian species of maple. It has been found only in southwestern China (Guizhou and Yunnan.).

Acer poliophyllum is a small evergreen tree up to 5 meters tall with dark gray bark. Leaves are non-compound, up to 7 cm wide and 4.5 cm across, thick and leathery, toothless, egg-shaped with no teeth or lobes.

References

External links
line drawing for Flora of China drawing 2 at left

poliophyllum
Plants described in 1979
Flora of Yunnan
Flora of Guizhou